Sauerbach may refer to:

 Sauerbach (Aal), a river of Baden-Württemberg, Germany, headwater of the Aal
 Sauerbach (Avenbach), a river of Baden-Württemberg, Germany, headwater of the Avenbach
 Sauerbach (Schweinnaab), a river of Bavaria, Germany